The Faculty of Human Sciences was a constituent body of Macquarie University. The Faculty offered undergraduate and postgraduate degree programs. It was home to a number of internationally recognised research centres conducting ground-breaking research across disciplines in areas like cognitive science and early childhood education. The Faculty was particularly renowned for its post-graduate programs in special education. The Faculty encompassed four departments and several research centres. The Faculty was disestablished in 2019.

Faculty departments and centres 
The Faculty of Human Sciences comprised four departments and several centres:

Departments formerly in the faculty
 Department of Cognitive Science
 Department of Educational Studies
 Department of Linguistics
 Department of Psychology

Centres previously hosted by the faculty
 Adult Migrant English Program Research Centre
 Macquarie Centre for Cognitive Science
 Macquarie E-Learning Centre of Excellence
 Macquarie University Special Education Centre
 Macquarie Centre for Reading
 ARC Centre of Excellence for Cognition and its Disorders

The Faculty of Human Sciences was disestablished in 2019. The Department of Educational Studies was moved to the Faculty of Arts, while the remaining three Departments (Cognitive Science, Linguistics, and Psychology) were moved to the Faculty of Medicine and Health Sciences which was renamed the Faculty of Medicine, Health and Human Sciences.

References

External links

Macquarie University